The Mickey Mouse Revue was an indoor audio-animatronic stage show at the Magic Kingdom and Tokyo Disneyland theme parks. It was one of the three original opening day attractions in Magic Kingdom's Fantasyland in 1971. After closing at Magic Kingdom in 1980, it was moved to Tokyo Disneyland for that park's opening in 1983 where it remained for 26 years before closing permanently in 2009.

The basic premise of the show was a musical concert, in which Mickey Mouse conducted an orchestra made up of various Disney characters.

Attraction

Pre-show
Before the concert, guests are loaded into a theater featuring an eight-minute film detailing the history of Mickey's illustrious career and the use of sound in his films, from his debut in Steamboat Willie to his role in the feature Fantasia. The film ends with footage of Mickey and his friends dancing at Disneyland, as Mickey then tells the guests that it is time for the main show.

Concert
After a cast member recites the theater's safety spiel, the house curtains open to reveal maestro Mickey Mouse and an orchestra made up of various Disney characters. After Mickey gives his count-off, the orchestra performs a medley of Disney songs; they are "Heigh-Ho", "Whistle While You Work", "When You Wish Upon a Star" and "Hi-Diddle-Dee-Dee". After they finish, they are lowered into the orchestra pit as the theater falls into darkness.

A spotlight is projected onto the side curtains, depicting a shadow of the Big Bad Wolf sneaking into the set. Afterward, a side curtain opens to reveal a scene from Three Little Pigs that takes place in Pratical Pig's brick house, in which the pigs play and sing "Who's Afraid of the Big Bad Wolf?"

The next act depicts scenes from Snow White and the Seven Dwarfs; the first has Snow White singing "I'm Wishing" to a group of forest animals, while the second features the Seven Dwarfs performing "The Silly Song" in their cottage.

On the far right of the stage, a scene from Alice in Wonderland appears, depicting Alice singing "All in the Golden Afternoon" along with a garden of live flowers as they sway in time with the song.

In the following act, The Three Caballeros appear to sing their theme song, with Donald Duck on maracas, Jose Carioca on guitar, and Panchito firing his pistols. Throughout their act, the trio disappears and reappears in various spots around the theater.

On the far left of the stage, a scene from Cinderella shows up, and the Fairy Godmother sings "Bibbidi-Bobbidi-Boo" while she magically transforms Cinderella's rags into a sparkling ballgown. After the scene fades out, a spotlight is produced on the side curtains, depicting Cinderella and her Prince Charming waltzing to "So This is Love".

For the grand finale, Br'er Rabbit, Br'er Fox and Br'er Bear appear to sing "Zip-a-Dee-Doo-Dah", while Mickey and the orchestra rise from their pit. As they play, characters from the previous acts reappear to join in the song, and the side curtains part to reveal a bright, sunny field as a rainbow gleams over the horizon. Once the performance concludes, the performers solemnly wrap up by singing the "Mickey Mouse Alma Mater", while the lights fade until there is only a spotlight shining on Mickey, who turns his direction to the audience, and takes a bow as all the other characters vanish from the show.

Mickey thanks the audience for watching the show and bids  farewell. The house curtains close, and the cast member recites another spiel as the guests exit the theater.

History

In a 1962 interview, Walt Disney talked about his new audio-animatronic technology in The Enchanted Tiki Room and untitled haunted house attraction. He said that he had similar plans for "all the Disney characters". Contributing Disney Imagineers were John Hench, Bill Justice, and Wathel Rogers.

The original theater at Walt Disney World sat 500 park guests, but the pre-show area only had room for 300, a planning mistake.

The animatronic Mickey currently resides in the Walt Disney Archives, and was put on display at the D23 Expo in 2011.

The animatronics of Donald, Jose and Panchito were put on display at D23's Destination D: Walt Disney World 40th event. In 2015, the figures were redressed and placed into the finale of Epcot's Gran Fiesta Tour attraction following a refurbishment in December of that year.

Cast
 Mickey Mouse - conductor
 Minnie Mouse - violin
 Daisy Duck - cello
 Pluto - high-hat cymbal
 Goofy - string bass
 Huey - trumpet
 Dewey - trumpet
 Louie - trumpet
 Ludwig Von Drake - ukulele
 Mad Hatter - bass clarinet
 March Hare - helps with bass clarinet
 Dormouse
 Winnie the Pooh - kazoo
 Rabbit - slide whistle
 Piglet - harmonica
 Monty (city mouse) - clarinet
 Abner (country mouse) - saxophone
 Gus - trombone
 Jaq - helps with trombone
 Dumbo - tuba
 Timothy - helps with tuba
 Kaa - his own tail
 King Louie - xylophone, timpani, etc.
 Baloo - flute

Songs
"Overture: Heigh-Ho/Whistle While You Work/When You Wish Upon a Star/Hi-Diddle-Dee-Dee"
"Who's Afraid of the Big Bad Wolf?" - The Three Little Pigs
"I'm Wishing" - Snow White
"The Silly Song" - The Seven Dwarfs
"All in The Golden Afternoon" - Alice and The Flowers
"The Three Caballeros" - Donald Duck, José Carioca and Panchito Pistoles
"Bibbidi-Bobbidi-Boo" - Fairy Godmother
"So This is Love" - Cinderella and Prince Charming
"Zip-a-Dee-Doo-Dah" - Brer Bear, Brer Fox, and Brer Rabbit, later joined by the rest of the cast
"Mickey Mouse Alma Mater" - Everybody
"Exit Music: Casey Jr/The Work Song/Mickey Mouse March/You Can Fly/A Spoonful of Sugar"

See also
 List of Magic Kingdom attractions
 List of Tokyo Disneyland attractions

References

Former Walt Disney Parks and Resorts attractions
Fantasyland
Audio-Animatronic attractions
1971 establishments in Florida
1980 disestablishments in Florida
1983 establishments in Japan
2009 disestablishments in Japan